Mirko Marić (born 16 May 1995) is a professional footballer who plays as a forward for  club Monza. 

Born in Bosnia and Herzegovina, Marić represented his native country internationally at youth level. He has Croatian citizenship, and represented Croatia internationally at both youth and senior level.

Club career

NK Široki Brijeg 
Marić started his professional career at Široki Brijeg.

Dinamo Zagreb 
Marić signed a seven-year contract with Croatian giants Dinamo Zagreb on 27 March 2014. He spent the rest of the season at Široki Brijeg, and then moved to Dinamo Zagreb in the summer.

NK Široki Brijeg 
Upon his arrival at Dinamo Zagreb in the summer of 2014, Marić was immediately loaned back to Široki Brijeg. He played six games for Široki Brijeg, including four in the Europa League qualifying phase. He scored two goals for Široki Brijeg in the second leg against Gabala in the first qualifying round. On 13 August 2014, Dinamo Zagreb withdrew their loan agreement with Široki Brijeg.

Lokomotiva
On 18 August 2014, Marić was loaned to NK Lokomotiva. He made his Prva HNL debut against Rijeka on 24 August 2014. Marić scored 28 goals in 94 games in all competitions.

Osijek
Marić joined Osijek in September 2017. In his second season, he became the league's second-best top scorer with 18 goals. By January 2020, in the following league season, Marić scored 14 goals in 19 matches. Good performances attracted various clubs; however, Osijek rejected a €5 million bid from Dynamo Kiev. He finished the season with 20 goals as the league's joint-top goalscorer, and left the club with 53 goals in 113 games in all competitions.

Monza
On 11 August 2020, Marić moved to newly-promoted Serie B side Monza, signing a five-year contract. He scored his first goal on 21 November, in a 1–1 draw to Pordenone in the league.

Loan to Crotone
On 17 August 2021, Marić moved to fellow-Serie B club Crotone on a one-year loan, with an option for purchase.

International career
Eligible to play for either Croatia or Bosnia and Herzegovina, Marić had stated that he wished to play for Croatia. He was called up for Croatia for the 2017 China Cup and played in two games.

Personal life 
His younger brother, Mateo, plays as a defensive midfielder for Lokomotiva in the 1. HNL.

Career statistics

Club

International

Honours 
Široki Brijeg
 Bosnia and Herzegovina Football Cup: 2012–13

Videoton
 Nemzeti Bajnokság I: 2017–18

References

External links
 
 Profile at A.C. Monza 
 

1995 births
Living people
People from Grude
Croats of Bosnia and Herzegovina
Association football forwards
Bosnia and Herzegovina footballers
Bosnia and Herzegovina youth international footballers
Croatian footballers
Croatia under-21 international footballers
Croatia international footballers
NK Široki Brijeg players
GNK Dinamo Zagreb players
NK Lokomotiva Zagreb players
Fehérvár FC players
NK Osijek players
A.C. Monza players
F.C. Crotone players
Premier League of Bosnia and Herzegovina players
Croatian Football League players
Nemzeti Bajnokság I players
Serie B players
Bosnia and Herzegovina expatriate footballers
Croatian expatriate footballers
Expatriate footballers in Hungary
Croatian expatriate sportspeople in Hungary
Bosnia and Herzegovina expatriate sportspeople in Hungary
Expatriate footballers in Italy
Croatian expatriate sportspeople in Italy
Bosnia and Herzegovina expatriate sportspeople in Italy